The 2019 European Parliament election in Spain was held on Sunday, 26 May 2019, as part of the EU-wide election to elect the 9th European Parliament. All 54 seats allocated to Spain as per the Treaty of Lisbon were up for election. Once the United Kingdom is effectively out of the European Union in a legal basis as a result of Brexit, 5 additional seats would be allocated to Spain. The election was held simultaneously with regional elections in twelve autonomous communities and local elections all throughout Spain.

Held one month after the 2019 Spanish general election, the Spanish Socialist Workers' Party (PSOE) of Prime Minister Pedro Sánchez scored a landslide victory—as well as the first win for the party in a European Parliament election in 15 years, also with Josep Borrell as its main candidate—by achieving 32.9% of the share and 20 seats, a result which allowed it to become the largest national delegation within the Progressive Alliance of Socialists and Democrats. Concurrently, the opposition People's Party (PP) suffered a severe setback and scored its worst result ever in a European Parliament election, but slightly improved on its general election results by achieving 20.2% of the vote and 12 seats. Citizens (Cs), which had integrated UPyD within its lists ahead of the election, became the third most-voted party of the country, but at 12.2% and 7 seats it only slightly improved on the combined Cs–UPyD results in 2014. Unidas Podemos Cambiar Europa, the alliance of Podemos and United Left (IU) suffered a considerable drop from both parties' past results, being reduced to 10.1% and 6 seats. Far-right Vox performed well below expectations after disappointing results for the party in the 2019 general election, scoring 6.2% of the share and 3 seats.

Afterwards, and as a result of the United Kingdom's withdrawal from the European Union coming into effect on 31 January 2020, five additional seats were allocated to Spain's MEP delegation, which were re-distributed by granting one each to PSOE, PP, Cs, Vox and Junts according to their May 2019 election results.

Electoral system
The 54 members of the European Parliament allocated to Spain as per the Treaty of Lisbon were elected using the D'Hondt method and a closed list proportional representation, with no electoral threshold being applied in order to be entitled to enter seat distribution. Seats were allocated to a single multi-member constituency comprising the entire national territory. Voting was on the basis of universal suffrage, which comprised all nationals and resident non-national European citizens over 18 years of age and in full enjoyment of their political rights. Additionally, Spaniards abroad were required to apply for voting before being permitted to vote, a system known as "begged" or expat vote. The use of the D'Hondt method might result in an effective threshold depending on the district magnitude.

Outgoing delegation

Parties and candidates
The electoral law allowed for parties and federations registered in the interior ministry, coalitions and groupings of electors to present lists of candidates. Parties and federations intending to form a coalition ahead of an election were required to inform the relevant Electoral Commission within ten days of the election call. In order to be entitled to run, parties, federations, coalitions and groupings of electors needed to secure the signature of at least 15,000 registered electors; this requirement could be lifted and replaced through the signature of at least 50 elected officials—deputies, senators, MEPs or members from the legislative assemblies of autonomous communities or from local city councils. Electors and elected officials were disallowed from signing for more than one list of candidates.

Below is a list of the main parties and electoral alliances which contested the election:

Campaign

Party slogans

Election debates

Opinion polls
The table below lists voting intention estimates in reverse chronological order, showing the most recent first and using the dates when the survey fieldwork was done, as opposed to the date of publication. Where the fieldwork dates are unknown, the date of publication is given instead. The highest percentage figure in each polling survey is displayed with its background shaded in the leading party's colour. If a tie ensues, this is applied to the figures with the highest percentages. The "Lead" column on the right shows the percentage-point difference between the parties with the highest percentages in a given poll. When available, seat projections are also displayed below the voting estimates in a smaller font.

Results

Overall

Distribution by European group

Elected legislators
The following table lists the elected legislators:

Notes

References
Opinion poll sources

Other

2019
Spain
European Parliament
May 2019 events in Spain